El Ain, Al Ain, or Ain is a village at an elevation of  on a foothill of the Anti-Lebanon Mountains in the Baalbek District of the Baalbek-Hermel Governorate, Lebanon.
It is famous for agriculture and trade, located on the highway connecting Syrian borders and the Hermel area with Chtaura and Beirut.

Its name, Ain, refers to the old water source in it.

History
In 1838, Eli Smith noted El Ain's population as being predominantly Metawileh.

Geography and Agriculture
The altitude of this village ranges from 900 to 1300 meters above sea level. The village is 125 km away from Beirut situated between the towns of Labwe and Fakiha. Its economy is restricted to agriculture (figs, olives, apples, pomegranate, apricots, peach and grapes).
Many source of water are distributed all around the village.

Weather Conditions
Winters in ElAin are cold and dry, with temperatures seldom reaching freezing point (-7° to -10°).  On average, it snows three to five times per season.  Summers are very hot and dry, with temperatures seldom reaching 40 °C. The average annual rainfall is 230 mm (9 in).

Notable people
Ali Hussain Sibat

References

Sources
(Mapquest)

Bibliography

External links
Ain, Localiban 

Populated places in Baalbek District

Shia Muslim communities in Lebanon